Darryl Hall (born November 10, 1963) is an American jazz bassist. He was born in Philadelphia and won the Thelonious Monk Institute of Jazz International Bass Competition in 1995.

He played on Ravi Coltrane's Mad 6 and Carmen Lundy's Soul to Soul.

References

External links
 Discogs bio

1963 births
Living people
Musicians from Philadelphia
20th-century American male musicians